BRISC complex subunit Abro1 is a protein that in humans is encoded by the FAM175B gene.

References

Further reading